Mohit Bhan is an Indian politician and currently serves as the spokesperson of the Jammu and Kashmir Peoples Democratic Party. He joined the PDP in July 2019 in the presence of Mehbooba Mufti.

He hails from the village of Tral located in south Kashmir's Pulwama district. Bhan is regularly seen on national television on behalf of Jammu and Kashmir Peoples Democratic Party.

References

Year of birth missing (living people)
Living people
Jammu and Kashmir Peoples Democratic Party politicians